The Memorial Centre Lipa Remembers (Memorijalni centar Lipa pamti) is a museum institution opened in April 2015 in a small locality of Lipa situated on the border between Croatia and Slovenia. Center functiones as a part of a larger Maritime and History Museum of the Croatian Littoral situated in Rijeka and it is cofounded by the Primorje-Gorski Kotar County and the Matulji Municipality.

Center is restored in a sight of the older Memorial museum of Lipa that functioned from 1968 till 1989 when it was closed due to lack of funds. Center is dedicated to the one event of the World War II history, to the suffering of 30 April 1944 when 269 inhabitants of Lipa were killed in just a few hours. Victims were all civilians, mainly elderly people, women and children. This crime was committed by the Nazis and Fascists during the Braunschweig offensive, a military operation aimed against the partisans. The killings of civilians were followed by ransacking and arson of their homes and outbuildings. Around hundred Lipa inhabitants survived, those who were lucky enough to be absent from the village at the time of the massacre: men being in partisans, women taking food to the partisan hideouts, children taking cattle to pastures, few man preparing traditional bonfire on the surrounding hills etc. Those survivors greeted the end of World War II homeless and desperate. A long and strenuous reconstruction began with lives affected by a sense of loss. Today Lipa lives and remembers.

Memorial Centre’s permanent exhibition interprets the history of World War II in the region of Liburnian Karst which, besides Lipa, incorporates the villages of Pasjak, Rupa, Šapjane and Brdce. Memorial exhibition is complemented by the cultural and ethnographic heritage of the region showing the continuity of life, starting from prehistoric times until today. Using a holistic approach, the tragic event of April 30, 1944 can be seen in a broader context, as one of the many identity features belonging to the vital and potent community of Lipa.

The Centers activities are based on the principles of community museums and homeland museums. In unity with the local population Centre actively contributes to the research and creation of this region’s identity, and also helps discovering new and sustainable possibilities for development and growth. All programme activities are concentrated on promoting tolerance, nonviolence and life in a multitude of its manifestations and features.

Suffering of Lipa on 30 April 1944

German occupation 
From October 1943 entire Liburnian Karst area is under German occupation within the Operational Zone of the Adriatic Littoral (OZAK).  After the Italian armistice Fascists continued to operate together with the occupational forces under the German command. Partisans were gathering in great secrecy, taking numerous guerrilla actions dependent on the local population that provided them hideouts, food and supplies.

In November 1943 OZAK was declared area for fighting against partisan "gangs" (Bandenkampfgebiet) and in January 1944 special Command of the SS and police was formed in Trieste (Fuhrungsstab für Bandenbekämpfen - FSBB) for planning and conducting that fight against partisans and their supporters under the command of Odilon Globočnik, Higher SS and Police Leader of OZAK. So-called Ten Commandments, rules issued on 24 February 1944 by general of the 97th German army corps Ludwig Kübler, encouraged occupiers to use looting, arson of civilian property and killing of civilian population as effective means of fighting the Partisan "gangs".

Braunschweig offensive 
Because of the German's inability to establish control over railroad and road traffic on the Rijeka-Trieste stretch, Ludwig Kübler decided to try to keep Istrian partisans away by launching a new offensive on the mountain massif Učka-Planik-Lisina. The offensive, known as the Braunschweig offensive was launched on 25 April 1944 with the participation of motorized Wehrmacht forces and special SS police formations. Anticipating the Nazis' intentions, partisans managed to withdraw the main force units from the Učka and Ćićarija sectors and transfer them north of the railway and the main road to the Klana-Kastav-Ilirska Bistrica area. Having moved most of their forces north, partisans went on with their operations and on 30 April 1944 launched a decisive attack with mortar fire on a garrison of fascist military police (Milizia per la Difesa Territoriale) situated in Rupa from a position near Lipa. The attack started at 5 a.m. and lasted two hours. The garrison's commander was Aurelio Piesz from Rijeka (Fiume). Unexpectedly, a smaller motorized German convoy appeared at Rupa and was subject to intense fire. Four German soldiers were killed and more still badly wounded; thereupon the partisan group withdrew to nearby Lisac village. An immediate rallying of Nazi and Fascist forces from the neighbouring and other garrisons followed.

Tragedy of the Lipa village 
They entered the village of Lipa around 2.30 p.m. and started a massacre by torturing and killing 21 inhabitants, by burning down houses (87) and stables (85), seizing cattle and other valuable resources.

The remaining inhabitants were ordered to pack their essentials and set out towards Rupa. At the last house in Lipa, they were told to leave their belongings and were forced into a building (so called Kvartirka's house), then the building was doused with petrol and set on fire. Many people were burned alive. The only survivors of the massacre were those who by chance were either not in Lipa that tragic Sunday, or somehow managed to hide (only six of them). 269 inhabitants were killed, of which were 96 children. The youngest victim Bosiljka Iskra was only 7 months old.

Without trustworthy documentation, it is not possible to ascertain why the Nazis vented their anger on and took a genocidal reprisal against, of all people, the inhabitants of Lipa. They certainly wanted to frighten the inhabitants of Liburnian karst and divide them from the National Liberation Movement, which they supported. Regardless of the motive and reasons this was one of the most appalling war crimes committed in the territory of Istria in World War II.

See also
Gudovac massacre
Ivanci massacre
Lidice massacre
Oradour-sur-Glane massacre

References

External link

Buildings and structures in Primorje-Gorski Kotar County
World War II museums
Axis war crimes in Yugoslavia
Croatia in World War II
Nazi war crimes in Italy
Massacres of Croats
Massacres committed by Nazi Germany

it:Eccidio di Lippa di Elsane